Danielithosia zolotuhini is a moth of the family Erebidae that is endemic to Vietnam. The species was first described by Vladimir Viktorovitch Dubatolov, Yasunori Kishida and Min Wang in 2012.

The forewings are yellowish buff with a diffuse brownish patch beyond the discal cell and at the discal vein. The hindwings are unicolorous yellow.

References

External links

Moths described in 2012
Endemic fauna of Vietnam
Lithosiina